Municipal elections were held in the Czech Republic on 23 and 24 November 1990 as part of nationwide municipal elections in Czechoslovakia. Voter turnout was 73.55%. A total of 51 parties contested the elections, which were won by the Civic Forum. The elections also saw the introduction of independent candidates, who received over 10% of the vote.

Results

References

1990
1990s elections in Czechoslovakia
November 1990 events in Europe